Max Schoen (11 May 1888 – 27 May 1959) was an American music educator, psychologist and scholar.

Life
Born in the Austro-Hungarian Empire, Schoen came to the United States in 1900 and was naturalized as a US citizen in 1918. He gained his BA from the City College of New York in 1911 and a PhD from the University of Iowa in 1921.  He taught at Carnegie Institute of Technology from 1922 until 1947, retiring as Professor and Head of the Department of Psychology and Education. After retirement he held visiting lectureships at Coe College, Iowa and Fisk University in Nashville.

Works
 (ed.) The Effects of Music. A series of essays, London: Kegan Paul & Co., 1927. The International Library of Psychology, Philosophy and Scientific Method
 The beautiful in music, London: K. Paul, Trench, Trubner & Co., 1928
 Human nature: a first book in psychology, New York & London: Harper & Brothers, 1930
 Art and beauty, New York: The Macmillan Company, 1932
 The psychology of music: a survey for teacher and musician, New York: Ronald Press, 1940
 (with Laurance F. Schaffer and B. von Haller Gilmer) Psychology, New York: Harper, 1940
 Bibliography of experimental studies on the psychology of music to 1936, 1940/1941
 (ed.) The enjoyment of the arts, New York: Philosophical Library, 1944
 Human nature in the making, Kingswood: Worlds Work, 1947
 (with H. G. Schrickel and Van Meter Ames) Understanding the world: an introduction to philosophy, New York & London: Harper & Bros, 1947
 (ed. with Dorothy M. Schullian) Music and medicine, New York: H. Schumann, 1948
 The man Jesus was, New York: A. A. Knopf, 1950
 (ed.) The effects of music: a series of essays, Freeport, N.Y.: Books for Libraries Press, 1968

References

1888 births
1959 deaths
American music psychologists
20th-century American psychologists
Austro-Hungarian emigrants to the United States